Dzubukuá (Dzubucua), or Kiriri, is an extinct Karirian language of Brazil. It is sometimes considered a dialect of a single Kariri language. A short grammatical description is available.

It was spoken on the São Francisco River islands, in the Cabrobó area of Pernambuco.

Phonology 
Phonology of the Dzubukuá language:

Consonants

Vowels 
Vowel sounds are presented as [i, ɨ, u, e, o, a] and [œ] which is written out as a double vowel oe. Nasal vowels are pronounced as [ɐ̃, ẽ, ĩ, õ, ũ] along with nasalized double vowels oê and aê, not pronounced as diphthongs, but as nasalized monophthongs [œ̃, æ̃].

Vocabulary

For an extensive vocabulary list of Dzubukuá by de Queiroz (2008), see the corresponding Portuguese article.

See also 

 Kipeá language

References

Kariri languages
Extinct languages of South America
Languages extinct in the 20th century